The 1st (West Africa) Infantry Brigade was an infantry formation of the British Army during the Second World War. It was formed in 1940 from battalions of the Royal West African Frontier Force and served in the East African campaign against the Italians and against the Japanese in Burma.

History
The 1st (West Africa) Infantry Brigade was originally raised in 1940 as the 3rd (Nigerian) Brigade. In this guise it was involved in the East African Campaign against the forces of the Italian Empire in Kenya under the command of Brigadier Gerald Smallwood. Later it was renamed the 23rd (Nigerian) Brigade and was attached to the 1st (African) Division. In February 1941, the 23rd (Nigerian) Brigade took the Italian Somaliland capital of Mogadishu.

In 1944 the Brigade was attached to the 82nd (West Africa) Division and renamed the 1st (West Africa) Infantry Brigade. In this same year it sailed for Ceylon, where the complete division was assembled on 20 July. They then moved to Burma and took part in the third Arakan campaign in December 1944.

During this campaign, the Brigade first advanced south along the Kalapanzin valley, then crossed a steep and jungle-covered mountain range to converge with the British 81st (West Africa) Division on Myohaung at the mouth of the Kaladan River. This move forced the Japanese to evacuate the Mayu peninsula which they had held for almost four years, and retreat south along the coast. They continued to advance maintaining pressure on the Japanese, capturing the port of Gwa shortly before the Japanese abandoned Burma.

Formations
The 1st (West Africa) Infantry Brigade was made up of the following units:

 1st Bn., The Nigeria Regiment;
 2nd Bn., The Nigeria Regiment;
 3rd Bn., The Nigeria Regiment;
 52nd (Nigeria) Light Battery West African Artillery;
 51st (Nigeria) Field Company, West African Engineers.

Notes

References

External links
 Burma Star.org

1 West African
Military units and formations in Burma in World War II
Military units and formations in British Somaliland in World War II
Military units and formations established in 1940
Military units and formations disestablished in 1945